Rabbit Mountain is an eroded volcanic outcrop in the Wrangell Volcanic Field, Yukon Territory, Canada, located 30 km southwest of Koidern and 4 km northwest of Canyon Mountain. It is east of the Yukon-Alaska boundary and can be accessed by old mining roads that reach Rabbit Creek. Rabbit Mountain formed as a result of melting of the crust, due to subduction of the Pacific Plate beneath the North American Plate and last erupted during the Pliocene. Like most volcanoes in the Yukon, Rabbit Mountain is part of the Pacific Ring of Fire, that includes over 160 active volcanoes.

See also
Wrangell Volcanic Field
List of volcanoes in Canada
Volcanism in Canada

References

Volcanoes of Yukon
Subduction volcanoes
Two-thousanders of Yukon